Sherilyn Reyes-Tan (born February 10, 1975) is a Filipino actress, comedienne, television personality, host and entrepreneur. She is known for her role as Liza Arellano in Sinungaling Mong Puso. 

She is also a parenting blogger and use Mama Shey as her name in her blogs. She has documenting her family adventures on her website and her incredibly popular Instagram account. She is also recognized as the mother of actor Ryle Paolo Santiago.

Education
She graduated from St. Theresa's College and from there dabbled in an acting career.

Business career
She owns the company Brand Cafe in Manila.

Acting career 
In 1997 she played a supporting role in the film Diliryo with Giselle Toengi and Jomari Yllana and 2002 in the film Pangako... Ikaw Lang with Regine Velasquez and Aga Muhlach where she played best friend to the female friend.

Personal life
Her son was born from her first husband Riley "Junjun" Santiago. She later married former basketball player Chris Tan and had Lorenz and Anya Sabrina.

Filmography

Television

Film

References

External links

Sparkle profile

1975 births
Living people
People from Manila
21st-century Filipino actresses
Filipino television actresses
Filipino women comedians
Filipino television personalities
GMA Network personalities
ABS-CBN personalities
21st-century Filipino businesspeople